Găiseni is a commune located in Giurgiu County, Muntenia, Romania. It is composed of four villages: Cărpenișu, Căscioarele, Găiseni and Podu Popa Nae.

References

Communes in Giurgiu County
Localities in Muntenia